Uvilla is an unincorporated community on West Virginia Route 230 in Jefferson County, West Virginia, United States.

References 

Unincorporated communities in Jefferson County, West Virginia
Unincorporated communities in West Virginia